Andrew (died 1294 or 1295) was a Hungarian prelate in the 13th century, who served as Bishop of Győr from 1291 until his death.

Biography
His origin is uncertain, but he was born into a large family. His three brothers earned university degree. Andrew was an educated prelate and skilled in theology and science. He was styled as doctor of canon law in 1283, thus possibly attended the University of Bologna or other Italian universitas. He was provost of Szenttamás (lit. "Saint Thomas" after Thomas Becket), which laid nearby Esztergom. Andrew served as grand provost of Esztergom between 1282 and 1286. Beside that he was referred to as chancellor of the court of Archbishop Lodomer from 1284 to 1286.

Andrew was made Bishop of Győr by February 1291, but according to non-authentic charters, he already held the office in July 1290. He was a confidant of Andrew III of Hungary and supported his efforts in order to strengthen royal power against the powerful lords and oligarchs. He participated in the military campaign against the Duchy of Austria in 1291, when Andrew III invaded Austria, forcing Duke Albert to withdraw his garrisons from the towns and fortresses that he had captured years before. Subsequently, he was a participant of the negotiations, which concluded the war. He attended the provincial synod of Esztergom, convened by Archbishop Lodomer on 6 May 1292. Andrew was last mentioned as a living person by contemporary records in August 1294. He died by April 1295, when his successor, Theodore Tengerdi first appeared as bishop-elect.

References

Sources

 
 
 
 
 

1290s deaths
13th-century Hungarian Roman Catholic priests
13th-century Roman Catholic bishops in Hungary
Bishops of Győr